Stavros Panagiotou (born 1 July 1993) is a Greek professional footballer who plays as a left-back for Super League club Levadiakos.

Honours
Levadiakos
Super League 2: 2021–22

References

1993 births
Living people
Greek footballers
Gamma Ethniki players
Football League (Greece) players
Super League Greece 2 players
Super League Greece players
A.E. Karaiskakis F.C. players
Olympiacos Volos F.C. players
A.E. Sparta P.A.E. players
Panegialios F.C. players
Levadiakos F.C. players
Association football defenders
Footballers from Arta, Greece